The Szechwan myotis (Myotis altarium) is a species of vesper bat. It is found in China and Thailand.

References

Mouse-eared bats
Mammals described in 1911
Bats of Asia
Taxa named by Oldfield Thomas
Taxonomy articles created by Polbot